Anthony H. Cordesman (born August 1, 1939) holds the Arleigh A. Burke Chair in Strategy at the Center for Strategic and International Studies (CSIS) and is a national security analyst on a number of global conflicts.

Career
He earned his B.A. from the University of Chicago (1960), his M.A. from the Fletcher School, Tufts University (1961), and his Ph.D. from the University of London (1963).

At CSIS, he has been the director of the Gulf Net Assessment Project and the Gulf in Transition study, and Principal Investigator of the CSIS Homeland Defense Project. He directed the Middle East Net Assessment Program, acted as co-director of the Strategic Energy Initiative, and directed the project on Saudi Arabia Enters the 21st Century. He is the author of a wide range of studies of energy policy, and has written extensively on oil and energy risks and issues, and is the co-author of The Global Oil Market: Risks and Uncertainties, CSIS, 2006. He is a former Professor of National Security Studies at Georgetown University and fellow at the Woodrow Wilson International Center for Scholars at the Smithsonian Institution.

Cordesman served as national security assistant to Senator John McCain of the Senate Armed Services Committee and as civilian assistant to the Deputy Secretary of Defense. He is also a former director of intelligence assessment in the Office of the Secretary of Defense. He directed the analysis of the lessons of the Yom Kippur War  for the Secretary of Defense in 1974, coordinating the U.S. military, intelligence, and civilian analysis of the conflict. He was awarded the Department of Defense Distinguished Civilian Service Award.

He has been visiting and lecturing in Asia since the 1960s, and is a senior advisor to the U.S.-Asia Institute. He was a guest lecturer in China on energy and Middle East security for the State Department in 2007. He is the co-author of Chinese Military Modernization: Force Development and Strategic Capabilities, CSIS, Washington, 2007.

Cordesman also served in other government positions, including at the United States Department of State, Department of Energy, and director of International Staff at NATO. He carried assignments posts in the United Kingdom, Lebanon, Egypt, Iran, Turkey and West Germany, and worked in Saudi Arabia.

Cordesman has authored over 50 books on U.S. security policy, military strategy, energy policy, and the Middle East. He is also a long-term contributor to the American hi-fi magazine, The Absolute Sound.

Gaza War analysis
On February 2, 2009, Cordesman published an analysis of the 2008–2009 Israel–Gaza conflict. The report relied on Israeli briefings before and after the conflict, including visits to the Israeli Defense Spokesman, interviews with Arab officials, and experts. The report analyzes the views and reactions of Arabs, but emphasized that Hamas has not provided more than "minimal details on the fighting, other than ideological and propaganda statements". Cordesman points out improvements in the capability of the Israeli Defense Forces since the fighting against Hezbollah in 2006. He believes the military used "decisive force" against legitimate targets, and that the killing of civilians (including women, children and the elderly), along with other human rights abuses, was justified by Israel's strategic, economic and political gains.

Cordesman's analysis also claimed that Israel did not violate the laws of war.

War in Iraq and Afghanistan
He has criticized the Bush Administration's efforts in both the Iraq and Afghanistan wars. According to an article in National Business Review, Cordesman was said to have been only "48 per cent" convinced on the need to invade Iraq in 2003, but contends that "concerns over Saddam's weapons of mass destruction were valid". He considers the current "chaos" in Iraq as the result of "pre-existing fractures in the country's social makeup", and a "tribal, clan-based society".

Iraqi Security Forces: A Strategy for Success
In 2006, Cordesman published Iraqi Security Forces: A Strategy for Success, documenting "both the initial mistakes and the recent changes in U.S. policy that now offer real hope of success in Iraq".

Israeli attack on Iran's nuclear program
In March 2009, Cordesman issued a detailed assessment entitled "Study on a Possible Israeli Strike on Iran's Nuclear Development Facilities". He concludes with the opinion that "Any realistic resolution to the Iranian nuclear program will require an approach that encompasses Military, Economic, Political interests and differences of the West vs Iran. There will be no lasting resolution to the Iranian nuclear program until the broader interests of Iran, the US, the region and the world are addressed. Iran should be engaged directly by the U.S. with an agenda open to all areas of military and non-military issues that both are in agreement or disagreement."

References

External links
 Cordesman answers readers' questions regarding the 2006 Israel-Lebanon conflict
 

1939 births
American military writers
Georgetown University faculty
Living people
University of Chicago Laboratory Schools alumni
Writers from Chicago
CSIS people